Warren East High School is a high school in Bowling Green, Kentucky. It is in the Warren County Public Schools.

Principal: Jonathan Vincent (2020-Present)
Assistant Principals: Jonathan Vaughn, Kyle Yates
Dean of Students: Amy Ground

References

Public high schools in Kentucky
Buildings and structures in Bowling Green, Kentucky
Schools in Warren County, Kentucky